Salhawas Assembly constituency is a former constituency of the Haryana Legislative Assembly, in Haryana, India.

See also
 Salhawas
 List of constituencies of the Haryana Legislative Assembly

References

Former assembly constituencies of Haryana